Howz-e Shah-e Bala persian حوض شاه بالا is a village in Khwahan Badakhshan Province in north-eastern Afghanistan.

References 

Populated places in Khwahan District